Cable 1971, otherwise known as Priority Signal or File 1971 was a high profile and secret military signal communicated in December 1952 between the two main inter-services branches of Pakistan–the Pakistan Army and the Pakistan Navy. It is notable for the fact that it essentially predicted the separation of Pakistan and Bangladesh and by coincidence its title contained the year in which the separation actually happened, almost 20 years later.

The military cable was directed through the Naval Intelligence and Military Intelligence to ISI sent to its headquarter and  came in the wake of reactionary of Basic Principles Committee's first report towards the writing of the first set of the Constitution of Pakistan. The cable was sent by then-Commodore S.M. Ahsan to DG ISI Major-General R. Cawthome on a file coincidentally numbered 1971. The cable discussed the implication of One Unit and one culture policy, religious fanaticism, and the economic parity between the West and East Pakistan that will ultimately result in the division of Pakistan into two different groups.

The cable's message read as:
 The creation of Committee of Ulema to veto the decisions taken in the House of People on religious matters, gives excess of powers to Ulema over the rights of elected representatives of the people. This gives an impression of Pakistan as being a theocratic state.
 To recommend that the head of the state should be a Muslim will unnecessarily create suspicions in minds of the minorities in Pakistan. The choice to select the head of the state should be left entirely to the people, to select without prejudice to caste, colour and creed.
 It is maintained by same officers that a single House elected on population basis should have been envisaged, and we should cease to think in terms of Bengalis, Pathans, Balochis, Sindhis, Punjabis etc. The parity between West & East Pakistan will ultimately result in the division of Pakistan into two different groups, therefore, it is the very negation of one people, one country and one culture.

The cable's message was further extended and discussed at the Army GHQ by MI's officer Major KM Arif when he compiled an "Intelligence Report No. 7894 of the Office of Intelligence Research and Analysis" in December 1970.

The cable is notable for its highlighted title and many historians found strange that the cable was coincidentally numbered: Cable/File 1971.

See also 

 Indo-Pakistani War of 1971
 Timeline of the Bangladesh Liberation War
 Military plans of the Bangladesh Liberation War
 Mitro Bahini order of battle
 Pakistan Army order of battle, December 1971
 Evolution of Pakistan Eastern Command plan
 1971 Bangladesh genocide
 Operation Searchlight
 Indo-Pakistani wars and conflicts
 Military history of India
 List of military disasters
 List of wars involving India

References

1952 in East Pakistan
1952 in Pakistan
Government of Pakistan secrecy
Causes and prelude of the Bangladesh Liberation War
1971 in Pakistan
Inter-Services Intelligence
History of the foreign relations of Pakistan
Indo-Pakistani War of 1971